The National Council of Educational Research and Training (NCERT) is an autonomous organisation of the Government of India which was established in 1961 as a literary, scientific and charitable Society under the Societies Registration Act. Its headquarters are located at Sri Aurbindo Marg in New Delhi. Roshan  is Director of the council since 2022.

History 

The Government of India's Ministry of Education resolved on 27 July 1961 to establish the National Council of Educational Research and Training, which formally began operation on 1 September 1961. The Council was formed by merging seven existing national government institutions, namely the Central Institute of Education, the Central Bureau of Textbook Research, the Central Bureau of Educational and Vocational Guidance, the Directorate of Extension Programmes for Secondary Education, the National Institute of Basic Education, the National Fundamental Education Centre, and the National Institute of Audio-Visual Education. It is separate from the National Council for Teacher Education.

It is the objective of the NCERT to design and support a common system of education for the country that is national in character, as well as to enable and encourage the diverse cultural practices across the country as a whole. Based on the recommendations of the Education Commission(1964–66), the first national policy statement on education was issued in 1968. The policy endorsed the adoption of a uniform pattern of school education across the country consisting of 10 years of general education program followed by 2 years of diversified schooling.

The NCERT is also behind the formation of the National Science Talent Search Scheme (NTSS) in the year 1963. The program was aimed at identifying, nurturing the talented students in India, and rewarding them with scholarships. The National Science Talent Search Scheme (NTSS) underwent a major change in the year 1976 with the introduction of the 10+2+3 pattern of education. The program was renamed to National Talent Search Scheme with the NTSE examination now being conducted for classes X, XI, and XII. Currently, the NTSE exam is conducted only for 10th class students in India in two phases with subjects relating to Mental Ability Test and Scholastic Aptitude Test (SAT) for 100 marks each.

The Curriculum for the Ten-year school 

This framework came in 1975. It emphasized that a curriculum based on the principles laid out in the framework has to be developed on the basis of research. Thus for NCERT, the 1970s was a decade flushed with curriculum research and development activities to narrate the content and process of education to Indian realities.

National Curriculum for Elementary and Secondary Education 

This revised curriculum framework was implemented in 1988 following the 1986 National Policy on Education. It encompassed 12 years of school education and suggested a reorientation of curricular and instructional materials to make them more child-centered. It advocated returning out examination reforms and the implementation of CCE at all stages of education.

National Curriculum Framework for School Education 

This framework came in 2000. It stressed the need for a healthful, agreeable, and stress-free adolescence and reduction of the curricular contents. Thus a multicultural thematic approach was recommended, environmental education was pronounced upon and language and mathematics got desegregated in the first two years of education.

National Curriculum Framework: The council came up with a new National Curriculum Framework in 2005, drafted by a National Steering Committee. This exercise was based on 5 guiding principles:

 Connecting knowledge to life outside school.
 Shift from the rote method of learning.
 Enriching the curriculum for the overall development of children so that it goes beyond textbooks.
 Making examinations flexible and integrating them with classroom life. and,
 Nurturing an identity informed by caring concerns.

In 2021, NCERT textbooks revision process was initiated by the Government of India by setting up a committee headed by former ISRO chief K Kasturirangan to prepare a document laying down various guidelines for changes in the curriculum of the council.

Logo 
The design of the NCERT logo is taken from an Ashokan period relic of the 3rd century BCE which was found in excavations near Maski in Raichur district, Karnataka. The motto has been taken from the Isha Upanishad and means 'life eternal through learning'. The three intertwined swans symbolize the integration of the three aspects of the work of NCERT, namely research & development, training and extension.

Textbooks
Textbooks published by NCERT are prescribed by the Central Board of Secondary Education (CBSE) from classes I to XII, with exceptions for a few subjects, especially for the Class 10 and 12 Board Examination. Around 19 school boards from 14 states have adopted or adapted the books. Those who wish to adopt the textbooks are required to send a request to NCERT, upon which soft copies of the books are received. The material is press-ready and may be printed by paying a 5% royalty, and by acknowledging NCERT.

The textbooks are in color-print and are among the least expensive books in Indian book stores. Textbooks created by private publishers are priced higher than those of NCERT. According to a government policy decision in 2017, the NCERT will have the exclusive task of publishing central textbooks from 2018, and the role of CBSE will be limited to conducting examinations.

National Council of Educational Research and Training had designed the books digitally in the Indian Sign Language from year 2021 for students with hearing disabilities from classes 1 to 5.

Regional Institutes of Education 

The Regional Institute of Education (RIE, formerly known as Regional College of Education), is a constituent unit of the National Council of Educational Research and Training (NCERT), New Delhi. The RIEs are set up in 1963 by the Government of India in different parts covering various regions. The Regional Institutes were started with the objective of qualitative improvement of school education through innovative pre-service and in-service teacher education programs and relevant research, development, and extension activities. The Regional Institutes of Education (RIEs) are located at Ajmer, Bhopal, Bhubaneswar, Mysore and Shillong.

Actions 

NCERT has a comprehensive extension program in which departments of the National Institute of Education, Regional Institute of Education, Central Institute of Vocational Education, and field coaches' offices in the states are engaged in activities. Several programs are organized in rural and backward areas to reach out to functionaries in these areas.

The council acts as the Secretariat of the National Development Group for Educational Innovations. It has been offering training facilities to education workers of other countries through attachment programs and workshops. The council publishes textbooks for school subjects from classes I to XII. NCERT publishes books & provides sample question papers that are used in government and private schools across India that follow the CBSE curriculum.

An online system named e-pathshala, a joint initiative of NCERT and Ministry of Human Resource Development, has been developed for broadcasting educational e-schooling resources including textbooks, audio, video, publications, and a variety of other print and non-print elements, ensuring their free access through mobile phones and tablets (as EPUB) and from the web through laptops and desktops.

National Council of Educational Research and Training had launched a new Diploma course in Guidance and Counselling for a period of one year from 1 November 2021.

National Council of Educational Research and Training had tied up with Microsoft’s global training partner, Tech Avant-Garde (TAG) and facilitated a Connected Learning Community (CLC) for improving digital skills among its teachers.

Controversies

Ever since its establishment, the organization has faced a great deal of controversy and continues to do so today. The disagreement centers around accusations of, on the one hand, the leftist bias of books, and on the other of suppressing the cultural and heritage history of India and attempted saffronizing of Indian history. Allegations of historical revisionism with a Hindu nationalist plan arose in two terms: under the Janata Party government 1977 to 1980 and again under the Bharatiya Janata Party government from 1998 to 2004. In 2012, the organization has been blamed for publishing 'undefensive' cartoons against B.R. Ambedkar, the architect of the Indian Constitution and thus lodging an insult to the Constitution, in its textbooks. The controversy led to the resignation of NCERT chief advisors Yogendra Yadav and Suhas Palshikar and an apology from the government. Again in 2022, a new controversy started when both CBSE and NCERT removed topics regarding Islamic Empires in the class 12 history textbook and chapters like “Challenges to Democracy” in the class 10 political science subject and many others, saying it is necessary to reduce syllabus to reduce examination pressure on students.

According to historian Sadanand More, the NCERT, as the zenith organization that provides advice and support for the improvement of school education, has been avoiding mentioning in school history books that about half of the Indian subcontinent was ruled by the Maratha Empire for a period before the British East India Company conquered it.

See also 

Indian Certificate of Secondary Education (ICSE)
 Central Board of Secondary Education (CBSE) 
 Joint Entrance Examination (Main)
 National Curriculum Framework (NCF 2005)

Notes

References

External links 

 

Educational organisations based in India
Organisations based in Delhi
Educational research
Research institutes in Delhi
Education policy in India
Teacher education in India
Training organizations in India
Educational institutions established in 1961
1961 establishments in Delhi